Brian Gulliver's Travels is a satirical comedy series and also a novel created and written by Bill Dare, first broadcast on 21 February 2011 on BBC Radio 4. A second series first broadcast on 25 June 2012 on BBC Radio 4 Extra. The series is a modern pastiche of the Jonathan Swift novel Gulliver's Travels.

Plot
The series revolves around the character Brian Gulliver, played by Neil Pearson. Gulliver is a travel documentary presenter who at the beginning of series is revealed to have been missing for six years, claiming to have travelled to the previously undiscovered continent of Clafrenia. His stories lead him to being put in psychiatric hospital where they believe that he is suffering some sort of delusion. In each episode he is visited by his daughter Rachel (Mariah Gale), who writes about the countries that he claims to have visited.

Production
Brian Gulliver's Travels is created and written by Bill Dare. According to the BBC website: "For years Bill Dare wanted to create a satire about different worlds exploring [Rudyard] Kipling's idea that we travel, 'not just to explore civilizations, but to better understand our own'. But science fiction and space ships never interested him, so he put the idea on ice. Then Brian Gulliver arrived and meant that our hero could be lost in a fictional world without the need for any sci-fi."

The BBC website also says that the original Gulliver's Travels was the only book that Dare read whilst he was at university.

The Book
The novel, inspired by some stories in the radio series, is published by Pilrig Press, 4 July 2013. 

It begins:

Reception
Of the novel, Ian Hislop wrote:  "A modern tale that keeps the flavour of the original classic, cleverly managing to provoke both laughter - and thought".

Gillian Reynolds, radio critic for The Daily Telegraph, praised Brian Gulliver's Travels saying that Gulliver was a "marvellous character" and that the series was "allusive, relevant, full of surprises, satirical in the true spirit of Swift. And very funny." Talking about the first episode, which was a satire on health and doctors, she said: "A nimbler reflection on achieving a national state of health is hard to imagine."

A review of the first episode in The Stage said that, "the point of Bill Dare's highly original format was to both satirise and issue a warning about the nanny state" and that, "The series began on an amusing and thought-provoking note."

Merchandise
The first episode of Brian Gulliver's Travels was made available on the BBC's "Comedy of the Week" podcast on 28 February 2011.   Likewise, the first episode of the second series was also released in the "Comedy of the Week" podcast (9 August 2012).  The entire first series was released by AudioGo on 8 August 2011.

The novel is available at many retail outlets and online stores including Amazon, Waterstones, and Pilrig Press.

Episodes

Series One

Series Two

See also
Gulliver's Travels
Vent, also featuring Neil Pearson

References

External links

BBC Radio comedy programmes
BBC Radio 4 programmes
BBC Radio 4 Extra programmes
2011 radio programme debuts
Satirical radio programmes
British satirical radio programmes